Georges-François-Marie Gabriel, a French miniature painter and designer, born in Paris in 1775, was a pupil of Naigeon and Regnault. Among his designs are those ordered by the French Government for the great work of the Institute on Egypt; and among his portraits is one of Madame de Maintenon, engraved by Mécou, which forms the frontispiece to her memoirs by Lafont d'Ausonne. The date of his death was on the 1st of January 1865 in the 14th arrondissement of Paris

References

 

1775 births
1865 deaths
18th-century French painters
French male painters
19th-century French painters
Portrait miniaturists
Painters from Paris
19th-century French male artists
18th-century French male artists